The May 15, 1998 Minnesota storms were several instances of severe thunderstorms that impacted much of Minnesota on May 15, 1998.  A combination of tornadoes, downbursts and large hail combined to cause $1.5 billion (1998 USD) in damage across the state.

Meteorological synopsis
Early on May 15, 1998, a stationary front was positioned from the western border of Minnesota, southward to Kansas.  To the east of the stationary front, temperatures and dew points were unseasonably high.  Several Minnesota cities reported record high dew points (including the Twin Cities of ) and low–minimum temperates for May 15.  A deepening area of low pressure over Kansas ejected to the north, moving along the stationary front.   Behind the low pressure area was much cooler and drier air.  The clash of these two differing air masses was the impetus for the development of the severe weather. 

The primary threat from these storm was large hail, which was enhanced by the strong downburst winds. In addition to the hail and high winds, five tornadoes also touched down with the supercells, killing one person.

Tornadoes
Five F1 tornadoes touched down in southern Minnesota between 2:10 pm – 4:00 pm CDT. Two of these tornadoes caused major damage, both touching down at 3:40 pm in different parts of the state.  One of the tornadoes touched down in the town of Albany.  It killed one person and injured 30 others when it hit a flea market.  The other tornado touched down in the northern suburbs of the Twin Cities metropolitan area.  The tornado touched down in Roseville, and then traveled 12 miles through Shoreview, North Oaks and Lino Lakes before lifting back up into the clouds in Blaine.  Seven houses were destroyed and several hundred more were damaged.

List of tornadoes

Aftermath
On June 23, 1998, 19 counties in central and southern Minnesota were declared Federal disaster areas for the wind and hail damage.  Damage from this event was estimated at over $1 billion.  Debris cleanup alone cost $18 million, the largest debris removal project in Minnesota's history.  

Two weeks after this event, another large storm blew through the area, hitting the southern Twin Cities metropolitan area hard.  This event caused an additional $200 million in damage across the state.

See also
 Climate of Minnesota
 List of North American tornadoes and tornado outbreaks

References

F0 and F1 tornadoes
1998 natural disasters in the United States
Tornadoes of 1998
1998 in Minnesota
Tornadoes in Minnesota
May 1998 events in the United States